The Pakistan Western Railway was one of two divisions of Pakistan Railways which operated between 1947 and 1971. The company was headquartered in Lahore. In 1971, Pakistan Western Railway renamed itself to Pakistan Railways.

Successors
With the loss of East Pakistan and Pakistan Eastern Railway, the Pakistan Western Railway renamed itself to Pakistan Railways.

See also
 History of rail transport in Pakistan
 Pakistan Railways

References

Defunct railway companies of Pakistan